The 1999–2000 season was Burnley's 5th season in the third tier of English football. They were managed by Stan Ternent in his second full season since he replaced Chris Waddle at the beginning 1998–99 campaign.

Burnley won promotion at Scunthorpe United on the final day of the season, reaching 2nd place for the first time that season and pipping Gillingham who had looked certainties for automatic promotion down the final stretch.  Selling their 2,500 ticket allocation at Glanford Park, there were also 7,000 Clarets watching from the Longside Stand at Turf Moor as the game was beamed back onto a big screen in the centre of the pitch.

Appearances and goals

|}

Transfers

In

Out

Matches

Second Division

Final league position

League Cup

1st Round First Leg

1st Round Second Leg

FA Cup

1st round

2nd round

3rd round

4th round

Football League Trophy

Northern Section 1st Round

References

Burnley F.C. seasons
Burnley